Endopeptidase La (ATP-dependent serine proteinase, lon proteinase, protease La, proteinase La, ATP-dependent lon proteinase, ATP-dependent protease La, Escherichia coli proteinase La, Escherichia coli serine proteinase La, gene lon protease, gene lon proteins, PIM1 protease, PIM1 proteinase, serine protease La) is an enzyme. This enzyme catalyses the following chemical reaction

 Hydrolysis of proteins in presence of ATP

This enzyme is a product of the lon gene in Escherichia coli.

References

External links 
 

EC 3.4.21